Bence Pásztor (born 5 February 1995) is a Hungarian hammer thrower.

He won a gold medal at the 2011 World Youth Championships in Athletics, establishing a new championship record.

Competition record

References

External links

1995 births
Living people
Hungarian male hammer throwers
World Athletics Championships athletes for Hungary